Allophylus edulis is a plant species in the genus Allophylus endemic to the Guianas, Brazil, Bolivia, Paraguay, Argentina and Uruguay.

Phytochemistry
Quebrachitol, a cyclitol, and viridiflorol, a sesquiterpenoid, are found in A. edulis.

Vernacular names 
This plant has several different common names.

In Paraguay it's called kokû, with a nasal ending. In Argentina, the common name is chal-chal (hence Los Chalchaleros, a folkloric music group), as in Portuguese. Other names in Brazil are aperta-goela, baga-de-morcego, chala-chala, chale-chale, cocum, fruta-de-paraó, fruta-de-passarinho, fruta-de-pavão, fruta-de-pavó, fruta-de-pombo, murta-branca, murta-vermelha, olho-de-pombo, pé-de-galinha, quebra-queixo, vacum and vacunzeiro.

References

External links 

edulis
Flora of the Southern Andean Yungas